Everything Acoustic is an EP released by Barenaked Ladies on September 30, 2003. It was recorded live in front of a small audience and contains acoustic versions of six tracks from Everything to Everyone , which was released the following month. The deluxe edition of Everything to Everyone contains a DVD of this performance, including most of the songs on the album.

Track listing

2003 EPs
Live EPs
Barenaked Ladies EPs
2003 live albums